"Key West Intermezzo (I Saw You First)" is a song by American rock musician John Mellencamp. It was released as the first single from his 14th studio album, Mr. Happy Go Lucky (1996), and peaked at number 14 on the US Billboard Hot 100, making it his final top-40 hit in the US. In Australia and New Zealand, the song became Mellencamp's final hit in both countries, reaching number 21 in Australia and number 35 in New Zealand. In Canada, it gave Mellencamp his fourth number-one single on the RPM Top Singles chart, staying at number one for five weeks. The song's music video features American actor Matthew McConaughey.

Track listings
US CD and cassette single, Australasian CD single
 "Key West Intermezzo (I Saw You First)" (edit) – 4:14
 "Like a Rolling Stone" – 6:28

US maxi-CD single, UK CD1, and Japanese CD single
 "Key West Intermezzo (I Saw You First)" (edit)
 "Wild Night" (live)
 "What If I Came Knocking" (live)
 "Small Town" (acoustic)

US 7-inch single
A. "Key West Intermezzo (I Saw You First)" (edit) – 4:14
B. "Just Another Day" – 3:28

UK CD2
 "Key West Intermezzo (I Saw You First)" (edit) – 4:15
 "Cold Sweat" (live) – 3:23
 "Check It Out" (live) – 6:14
 "Like a Rolling Stone" (live) – 6:27

Charts

Weekly charts

Year-end charts

Decade-end charts

Release history

References

1996 singles
1996 songs
John Mellencamp songs
Mercury Records singles
RPM Top Singles number-one singles
Songs written by George Green (songwriter)
Songs written by John Mellencamp